Richard Anthony David Mercer (14 January 1951 – 25 October 1996) was an English cricketer.  Mercer was a right-handed batsman who fielded as a wicket-keeper.  He was born in Stockholm, Sweden.

Mercer graduated from Durham University (University College) in 1973 with a degree in Politics and Sociology.

He made his debut for Durham against Northumberland in the 1973 Minor Counties Championship.  He played Minor counties cricket for Durham from 1975 to 1988, making 104 Minor Counties Championship appearances and 7 MCCA Knockout Trophy appearances.  He made his List A debut against Northamptonshire in the 1977 Gillette Cup.  He made 8 further List A appearances for Durham, the last of which came against Warwickshire in the 1986 NatWest Trophy.  In his 9 List A matches for Durham, he scored 47 runs at a batting average of 6.71, with a high score of 23.  Behind the stumps he took a single catch and made 2 stumpings.  He also played List A cricket for Minor Counties North, making 2 appearances against Yorkshire and Nottinghamshire in the 1979 Benson & Hedges Cup, though without success.

He died in Hexham, Northumberland on 25 October 1996.

References

External links
Richard Mercer at ESPNcricinfo
Richard Mercer at CricketArchive

1951 births
1996 deaths
Sportspeople from Stockholm
English cricketers
Durham cricketers
Minor Counties cricketers
Alumni of University College, Durham
Wicket-keepers